The Fat Lady Sings - Best of the Springbok Nude Girls 1995-2001 is a compilation album from the South African alternative rock band Springbok Nude Girls. It was released in 2001 by Epic records in South Africa.

Track listing

References

Springbok Nude Girls albums
2001 compilation albums